Sağlık is a small town in Konya Province, Turkey

Geography 
Sağlık is in Meram district, capital of which is actually in Greater Konya . At  it is a small town situated on the northern slopes of a hill  to the west of Konya. The population is 815 as of 2011.

History 
The former name of the town was Ağrıs. After the Seljuk rule the town was annexed by the Karamanids in 1308.  There were two public buildings commissioned by 
Karamanids in the 15th century: A religious school  built in 1421 and a zaviye (house of religious order) named Doğan Yörük zaviyesi . Sağlık was a village during Ottoman Empire era. In 1884  census,  the total population was found to be 585. In 1971 Sağlık was declared a township.

Economy 
The main economic activity is agriculture and animal husbandry. The town has always been famed for hot springs. In a systematical research, it is reported that the temperature of the water is 60 °C (140 °F) and the flow rate is 55 lt/s. Thermal spas under planning or construction may contribute to town economy.

References 

Populated places in Konya Province
Towns in Turkey
Spa towns in Turkey
Meram District